The Women's team pursuit at the 2012 UCI Track Cycling World Championships was held on April 5. 14 nations of 3 cyclists each participated in the contest. After the qualifying, the fastest 2 teams raced for gold, and 3rd and 4th teams raced for bronze.

Medalists

Results

Qualifying

 The time set by the Australian team in qualifying was itself a new world record, but was immediately overtaken by the Great Britain team.

Finals
The finals were held at 19:15.

Small Final

Final

References

2012 UCI Track Cycling World Championships
UCI Track Cycling World Championships – Women's team pursuit